is a former Japanese football player.

Playing career
Nakao was born in Kimotsuki District, Kagoshima on 8 September 1981. After graduating from high school, he joined J2 League club Consadole Sapporo in 2000. On 23 April, he debuted as substitute midfielder from the 77th minute against Montedio Yamagata. Although the club was promoted to J1 League from 2001, he could hardly play in the match until 2002. In August 2002, he moved to J2 club Yokohama FC on loan. He played many matches as defensive midfielder. In 2003, he returned to Consadole Sapporo. Although the club was relegated to J2 from 2003, he played many matches as defensive midfielder. However he was arrested with teammate Tatsunori Arai for driving under the influence and was sacked with Arai in August. In August 2004, he moved to Regional Leagues club Shizuoka FC. In 2006, he moved to Regional Leagues club FC Gifu. He played many matches and the club was promoted to Japan Football League from 2007. In 2008, he moved to Prefectural Leagues club Azul Claro Numazu. He retired end of 2010 season.

Club statistics

References

External links

1981 births
Living people
Association football people from Kagoshima Prefecture
Japanese footballers
J1 League players
J2 League players
Japan Football League players
Hokkaido Consadole Sapporo players
Yokohama FC players
FC Gifu players
Azul Claro Numazu players
Association football midfielders